Appaji M. J. (20 June 1951  – 2 September 2020) was an Indian Politician from the state of Karnataka. He served as a three term member of the Karnataka Legislative Assembly.

M. J died from COVID-19 in September 2020.

Constituency
He represented the Bhadravati constituency.

Political Party
He was from the Janata Dal (Secular).

External links 
 Karnataka Legislative Assembly

References 

Janata Dal (Secular) politicians
Karnataka MLAs 2013–2018
People from Shimoga district
Bharatiya Janata Party politicians from Karnataka
1951 births
2020 deaths
Deaths from the COVID-19 pandemic in India